In political science, the urban–rural political divide is a phenomenon in which predominantly urban areas and predominantly rural areas within a country have sharply diverging political views. It is a form of political polarization. Typically, urban areas exhibit more liberal, left-wing, cosmopolitan and/or multiculturalist political attitudes, while rural areas exhibit more conservative, right-wing, right-wing populist and/or nationalist political attitudes.

An urban–rural political divide has been observed worldwide in many nations including the United States, the United Kingdom, France, Australia, Hungary, Poland, Belgium, Italy, the Netherlands, Turkey, Thailand, and Malaysia. Political divisions between urban and rural areas have been noted by political scientists and journalists to have intensified in the 21st century, and in particular since the Great Recession. In Europe, the increasing urban-rural polarization has coincided with the decline of center-left parties and concomitant rise of far-left and far-right parties, a trend known as Pasokification.

See also
 Agrarianism
 Anti-urbanism
 Centralismo (Peru)
 Cleavage (politics)
 Rural–urban fringe

References

Further reading
 

Political science
Political geography
Urban sociology
Conflict theory
Urban studies and planning terminology
Demographic economic problems